or  is a lake in the municipality of Rana in Nordland county, Norway. The glacial lake is also the headwaters of the Blakkåga river, a tributary to the main river Ranelva.

See also
 List of lakes in Norway
 Geography of Norway

References

Rana, Norway
Lakes of Nordland